Benjamin Kindsvater (born 8 February 1993) is a German professional footballer who plays as a left midfielder for VfR Aalen.

Career statistics

References

External links

1993 births
Living people
Association football midfielders
German footballers
SV Wacker Burghausen players
TSV 1860 Munich players
FC Nitra players
VfR Aalen players
3. Liga players
Regionalliga players
Slovak Super Liga players
German expatriate footballers
German expatriate sportspeople in Slovakia
Expatriate footballers in Slovakia